Maristela or Maristella is a feminine given name and a surname common in Spanish and Portuguese speaking countries. It may refer to the following people:

Given name
Maristela Salvatori (born 1960), Brazilian artist and printmaker
Maristella Agosti (born 1950), Italian researcher and professor
Maristella Lorch, American critic of Italian literature
Maristella Svampa (born 1961), Argentine sociologist

Surname
Jose Concepcion Maristela Sr. (1916–1979), Filipino military officer
Trixie Maristela (born 1980), Filipino transgender woman, LGBT rights advocate, actress and beauty queen

See also

Marestella Torres-Sunang (born 1981), Filipina long jumper
Mariastella Gelmini (born 1973), Italian politician and attorney